Amythaonius was in Ancient Greece a patronymic from Amythaon, by which his son, the seer Melampus, was sometimes called. The descendants of Amythaon in general were called by the Greeks Amythaonidae.

Notes

References 

 Publius Vergilius Maro, Bucolics, Aeneid, and Georgics of Vergil. J. B. Greenough. Boston. Ginn & Co. 1900. Online version at the Perseus Digital Library.
 Strabo, The Geography of Strabo. Edition by H.L. Jones. Cambridge, Mass.: Harvard University Press; London: William Heinemann, Ltd. 1924. Online version at the Perseus Digital Library.
 Strabo, Geographica edited by A. Meineke. Leipzig: Teubner. 1877. Greek text available at the Perseus Digital Library.

Patronymics from Greek mythology